Canne may refer to:
 Canne, Apulia, or Cannae, an ancient village in Italy
 Kanne, or Canne in Old French, a village in Belgium
 , a river in France, tributary of the Cosson
  a river in France, tributary of the Aron
 Canne (weapon), used in a French martial art
 John Canne, 17th-century Englishman

See also 
 
 Cannae (disambiguation)
 Cannes, a city in France
 Cann (disambiguation)
 Kanne (surname)